The 2011–2012 Cyclo-cross Superprestige events and season-long competition took place between 9 October 2011 and 11 February 2012. Sven Nys was the defending champion and prolonged his title to win his 11th Superprestige.

Results

Standings
In each race, the top 15 riders gain points, going from 15 points for the winner decreasing by one point per position to 1 point for the rider finishing in 15th position. In case of ties in the total score of two or more riders, the result of the last race counts as decider. If this is not decisive because two or more riders scored no points, the penultimate race counts, and so on until there is a difference.

External links
 Official website

S
S
Cyclo-cross Superprestige